Berta Zebinger (unknown – unknown) was an Austrian chess player who won the Austrian Women's Chess Championship (1955).

Biography
From the begin 1950s to the mid-1960s Berta Zebinger was one of the leading Austrian women's chess players. In Austrian Women's Chess Championship she won three medals: gold (1955) and two silver (1952, 1964).

Berta Zebinger played for Austria in the Women's Chess Olympiad:
 In 1957, at second board in the 1st Chess Olympiad (women) in Emmen (+4, =1, -6).

References

Year of birth missing
Year of death missing
Austrian female chess players
Chess Olympiad competitors
20th-century chess players